James Balfe was an Irish footballer who played as a full back in the Irish League for Bohemians and Shelbourne. He won two caps for Ireland and represented the Irish League and Ireland at amateur level.

Personal life 
Balfe's older brother John was also a footballer. He worked as a brush maker.

Honours 
Shelbourne

 City Cup: 1908–09
 Leinster Senior Cup: 1908–09

References

Irish association footballers (before 1923)
NIFL Premiership players
Bohemian F.C. players

Association football fullbacks
Shelbourne F.C. players
Northern Ireland amateur international footballers
Irish League representative players
Pre-1950 IFA international footballers
Year of death missing
Place of death missing
1876 births
Association footballers from Dublin (city)